Olga Hachatryan (born July 6, 1992) is a Turkmenistani swimmer who specialized in sprint freestyle events. Hachatryan represented Turkmenistan at the 2008 Summer Olympics in Beijing, where she swam in the women's 100 m freestyle event, against Malta's Madeleine Scerri and Macedonia's Elena Popovska. She finished the race in last place for both the first heat and the overall standings, with a time of 1:14.77.

References

External links
 
 
 

1992 births
Living people
Turkmenistan female swimmers
Olympic swimmers of Turkmenistan
Swimmers at the 2008 Summer Olympics
Turkmenistan female freestyle swimmers
Sportspeople from Ashgabat
Turkmenistan people of Armenian descent
Ethnic Armenian sportspeople